Dicaprio Bootle (born September 17, 1997) is an American football cornerback for the Kansas City Chiefs of the National Football League (NFL). He played college football at Nebraska.

Early life and education
Bootle was born on September 17, 1997, in Miami, Florida. He attended Killian High School and Southridge High School, both in Miami. He was ranked in the top-60 in the nation at the cornerback position by ESPN. Bootle received numerous scholarship offers, but only visited Nebraska.

Bootle redshirted in his first season and spent the year on Nebraska's scouting team. In his second year, he played in all 12 games as a redshirt freshman, compiling 15 tackles. His sophomore year, Dicaprio started in all 12 games, and totaled a career-high 39 tackles. He also had his first forced fumble. His 15 pass breakups in 2018 led all Big Ten teams. He was named third-team All-Big Ten for his sophomore performance.

Bootle started the first 8 games of his junior year at cornerback, and finished the year starting at safety. Bootle recorded 31 tackles and six pass breakups in 2019. In his final season, he started every game again, bringing his streak to 32 consecutive starts, and recorded 25 tackles. His first and only career interception came against Iowa.

Bootle chose to forgo remaining eligibility and declare for the 2021 NFL Draft.

College statistics

Professional career

After going unselected in the 2021 NFL Draft, Bootle signed as an undrafted free agent with the Kansas City Chiefs. He was waived on August 31, 2021. He was signed to the practice squad the next day. He was elevated from the practice squad via a standard elevation prior to their week four game against the Philadelphia Eagles. Bootle was again elevated from the practice squad in week 16 against the Pittsburgh Steelers after the defense lost starters for the game due to COVID-19 protocols. He took advantage of the opportunity by leading the team in tackles for the game with seven. He signed a reserve/future contract with the Chiefs on February 2, 2022.

On August 30, 2022, Bootle was waived by the Chiefs. He was re-signed to the practice squad on September 13, 2022. He was promoted to the active roster on October 15. He was waived on October 17 and re-signed to the practice squad. Bootle became a Super Bowl champion when the Chiefs defeated the Philadelphia Eagles in Super Bowl LVII. He signed a reserve/future contract on February 15, 2023.

References

External links
Kansas City Chiefs bio

1997 births
Living people
Nebraska Cornhuskers football players
Kansas City Chiefs players
Players of American football from Florida
American football safeties
American football cornerbacks
Miami Southridge Senior High School alumni